Chérif Moumina Sy (born 17 May 1960) is a Mauritanian-born Burkinabé politician who served as the transitional Head of Parliament from 2014 to 2015.

Biography

Journalism career
Sy is the son of army general Baba Sy, who participated in the 1983 revolution that brought Thomas Sankara to power. After Sankara's death in 1987, the younger Sy moved to Paris and headed the Committee for Defense of the Revolution. He was a critic of President Blaise Compaoré. Sy was a journalist by profession and edited the newspaper "Bendre". In March 2013, he was re-elected chief of the Society of Editors of the Private Press.

Sy played an important role in the popular demonstrations that deposed Compaoré in 2014. Michel Kafando was chosen as president in November 2014 after a panel of 23 officials preferred him to Joséphine Ouédraogo and Sy. He became President of the National Transitional Council of Burkina Faso on 27 November. He defeated his main challenger, Ibrahim Koné by a 71 to 14 voting margin. He put forth a number of proposals in this position, such as revoking the death penalty as his friend Norbert Zongo was put to death. Sy also sponsored a law on the right of access to information. However, his most controversial law amended the electoral code.

Role in coup and aftermath
He was acting president between 17 and 23 September 2015, during the September 2015 coup led by Gilbert Diendéré. President Michel Kafando and Prime Minister Isaac Zida were held hostage as a result. "The coup was not a surprise," he said. "I have always said since the beginning of the transition if that unit was not dissolved, these forces would be deployed elsewhere and that we would have problems." He soon published a statement saying that dialogue was under-way between the military leadership and the "elements of the RSP" responsible for the coup, and noted that the country was in danger. Sy was a critic of the coup from the start. Known for his firmness of manner, he condemned an agreement proposed in the Economic Community of West African States by both African mediators, Senegalese President Macky Sall and Benin's Yayi Boni, that would allow the former supporters of Blaise Compaoré to compete in elections and offer amnesty to the perpetrators of the coup.

Since he was third most important official in the country, Sy declared himself interim president. He initiated a social media campaign to oust the coup's leaders. A large part of the army went along with his campaign, as they distrusted Dendiere and the Presidential Guard.  Dendiéré ended up admitting the coup was a mistake. When elections were announced for November, Sy declined to participate and exited Burkinabe politics. He was awarded a journalism award for his role in ending the coup.

On 15 March 2016, he delivered the keynote speech at a conference in Accra, Ghana, entitled "Promoting Professional Journalism for Good Governance in West Africa." He has been characterized as "a Sankarist through and through."

References

1960 births
People from Hodh Ech Chargui Region
Heads of state of Burkina Faso
Living people
Burkinabé Muslims
21st-century Burkinabé people